Queenwood Ladies' College was a private school for girls, opened on a hill overlooking the sea in Eastbourne, East Sussex, England.   It was opened in 1871 by a Mrs Lawrance, the mother of Miss Grace Lawrance, founder of Queenwood School for Girls, Sydney.  At this time the town was just beginning a period of growth and prosperity and seeing the arrival of many other private schools, thanks to its  reputation for health, enhanced by bracing air and sea breezes. Dorothea Petrie Townshend Carew wrote a book about the school.

Notable former pupils

Martita Hunt, actress
Dorothea Petrie Townshend Carew, writer
Nellie Kirkham, historian, artist and writer
Minoo Moshiri, translator, writer

References

Girls' schools in East Sussex
Schools in Eastbourne
Defunct schools in East Sussex
Educational institutions established in 1871
1871 establishments in England